The Hong Kong Jockey Club Champion Awards are given annually by the Hong Kong Jockey Club (HKJC) to the outstanding horses and people in Hong Kong Thoroughbred horse racing.

The most prestigious award for horses is Hong Kong Horse of the Year.

The equivalent in Australia is the Australian Thoroughbred racing awards, in Canada the Sovereign Awards, in the United States the Eclipse Awards, in Japan the JRA Awards and in Europe, the Cartier Racing Awards.  

Current awards:
Hong Kong Horse of the Year
Hong Kong Most Popular Horse of the Year
Hong Kong Champion Sprinter
Hong Kong Champion Miler
Hong Kong Champion Middle-distance Horse
Hong Kong Champion Stayer
Hong Kong Champion Griffin
Hong Kong Most Improved Horse

References
Hong Kong Jockey Club News Archive

Horse racing awards
Horse racing in Hong Kong
zh:冠軍人馬獎